"Point of No Return" is the title of the second single taken from the Nu Shooz album Poolside. The song spent one week at #1 on the Billboard Hot Dance Club Play chart in September 1986. It also peaked at #28 on the Billboard Hot 100 chart and #36 on the R&B chart in the U.S., as well as topping out at #48 on the UK singles chart. The song was mixed by Shep Pettibone.

Music video
The music video features band member Valerie Day walking on the Hollywood Walk of Fame and entering a ballet studio, meeting up with her husband John Smith and opening a closet full of sneakers and dancing shoes animated with stop motion (including pixilation). Valerie and John start dancing themselves as well. The shoes also form the flags of United States, UK, France, and Canada. 
The video ends with Valerie and John walking in stop motion and pixilation with the shoes.  The video was directed by Wayne Isham.

Charts

See also
 List of number-one dance singles of 1986 (U.S.)

References

1986 singles
Nu Shooz songs
Music videos directed by Wayne Isham